Ernest George Batley (East London, 1874-Bournemouth, 1965) was a British director of silent films and actor, and was married to Ethyle Batley.

References

1874 births
1965 deaths
Male actors from London